Kudarz (also Romanized as Kūdarz; also known as Gūdzar, Kūdzar, and Kūzdar) is a village in Amanabad Rural District, in the Central District of Arak County, Markazi Province, Iran. At the 2006 census, its population was 616, in 213 families.

References 

Populated places in Arak County